Les Gobelins is a station on Line 7 of the Paris Métro. It opened on 15 February 1930 as part of a planned section of the line, which was temporarily operated as part of Line 10 until the completion of the under-Seine crossing of Line 7 from Pont de Sully to Place Monge. The station was integrated into Line 7 on 26 April 1931. The station is at the crossroads of four main roads: the Avenue des Gobelins, Boulevard Saint Marcel, Boulevard Arago and Boulevard de Port-Royal.

This station is named after the Avenue des Gobelins, which honours the Gobelin family who manufactured dyes from the mid 15th century on the banks of the nearby river Bièvre (now covered in the area). The family manufactured tapestry from 1662, until the factory (adjacent to the station) was acquired by Louis XIV.

Station layout

References

Paris Métro stations in the 13th arrondissement of Paris
Railway stations in France opened in 1930